The 2018 Hull City Council election took place on 3 May 2018 to elect members of Hull City Council in England. This was on the same day as other nationwide local elections. Following a review of Ward boundaries by the Local Government Boundary Commission for England (LGBCE) the whole council was up for election as the number of councillors was reduced by two and boundaries of all seats redrawn.  The Labour party was defending overall control of the council, which they achieved but with a greatly reduced majority.

This result had the following consequences for the total number of seats on the Council after the elections:

Results summary

The votes and percentage expressed above for Independent is a combination of votes cast for candidates described as Independent, Democrats and Veterans Party, The Yorkshire Party and where no description was provided on the official declaration of candidature or result.

Ward results
An asterisk * indicates an incumbent for one of the former wards who stood for re-election.

Turnout figures where stated are the number of ballot papers handed out in a ward including any rejected ballot papers.

Avenue

Beverley and Newland

Boothferry

Bricknell

Central

Derringham

Drypool

Holderness

Ings

Kingswood

Longhill and Bilton Grange

Marfleet

Newington and Gipsyville

North Carr

Orchard Park

Pickering

Southcoates

St Andrews and Docklands

Sutton

University

Joyce Korczak Fields had previously won the election in University Ward in 2015 for Labour.

West Carr

References

2018 English local elections
2018
2010s in Kingston upon Hull